Thakur Jorawar Singh, was the eldest son of  Thakur Shardul Singh, the ruler of Jhunjhunu. He was born at Kant, married and had children. He died in 1745. He built the Jorawargarh fort (which later on served as a Prison/Jail) and presently houses some Govt. offices in the city of Jhunjhunu. He was the ancestor of the families of Chowkari, Taen,  Malsisar, Mandrella, Dabri Dheer Singh, Gangiyasar, etc.

History of Rajasthan
People from Jhunjhunu district
Year of birth missing
1745 deaths